Mononychellus tanajoa, the cassava green mite, is a species of spider mite.

References

Trombidiformes